Tazeh Kand-e Sharifabad (also Romanized as Tāzeh Kand-e Sharīfābād; also known as Tazeh Kand-e Vasfabad, also Romanized as Tāzeh Kand-e Vaşfābād) is a village in Kalkharan Rural District, in the Central District of Ardabil County, Ardabil Province, Iran. At the 2006 census, its population was 735, in 145 families.

References 

Towns and villages in Ardabil County